Primary Health Care is a professional magazine published 10 times a year by the RCNi, part of the Royal College of Nursing group. It publishes news, features, and clinical articles relevant to the practice of community health nursing in the United Kingdom. It is available in print or digital format.

The magazine was established in 1982. It is indexed by the British Nursing Index and CINAHL and available through most online aggregators as well as from the publisher.

In 2014 it had an average circulation of over 7,150.

See also
Portal:Nursing
List of nursing journals

References

External links
 

1982 establishments in the United Kingdom
General nursing journals
Health magazines
Magazines established in 1982
Primary care
Professional and trade magazines
Royal College of Nursing publications
Ten times annually magazines